Alexander Ireland (10 April 1901 – 25 January 1966) was a Scottish amateur and professional welter/middleweight boxer of the 1920s and 1930s. He fought under the name of Alex Ireland.

Biography
Ireland won the 1921 Amateur Boxing Association British welterweight title, when boxing out of the United Scottish BC. 

He won a silver medal in the welterweight boxing at the 1920 Summer Olympics in Antwerp, Belgium losing to Canadian boxer Bert Schneider in the final, and the Scottish Area welterweight title, the National Sporting Club (NSC) (subsequently known as the British Boxing Board of Control (BBBofC)) British middleweight title, British Empire middleweight title, and European Boxing Union (EBU) middleweight title. He was born in Leith.

Olympic games results
1920 (as a welterweight)
 1st round bye
 Defeated Willy Reichenbach (Switzerland)
 Defeated August Suhr (Denmark)
 Defeated William Clark (United States)
 Lost to Bert Schneider (Canada)

References

External links
Alexander Ireland's profile at databaseOlympics
Image - Alex Ireland
Alexander Ireland's profile at Sports Reference.com

1901 births
1966 deaths
Boxers at the 1920 Summer Olympics
Date of death missing
Middleweight boxers
Olympic boxers of Great Britain
Olympic medalists in boxing
Olympic silver medallists for Great Britain
People from Leith
Place of death missing
Scottish male boxers
Welterweight boxers
Medalists at the 1920 Summer Olympics
Scottish Olympic medallists
Boxers from Edinburgh